Calveriosoma hystrix is a species of sea urchin of the family Echinothuriidae. Their armour is covered with spines. Calveriosoma hystrix was first scientifically described in 1872 by Thomson.

References 

Animals described in 1872
Echinothuriidae